Stutterer is a short drama film written and directed by Benjamin Cleary and produced by Serena Armitage and Shan Christopher Ogilvie.

Plot
Greenwood, a lonely typographer, makes a phone call to discuss a bill issue, but his stutter keeps him from getting his words out and he is hung up on. Later, in a conversation with his online girlfriend Ellie on Facebook, Ellie says she has a surprise for Greenwood and will tell him the next day.

In public, Greenwood makes "snap judgement" observations about strangers he sees, clearly speaking the thoughts inside his head. While walking to his father's house, he practices in his head a quote he wants to speak to his father. While playing a game of Go with him, he's finally able to get the quote out, albeit slowly, and his father is pleased. Later that night, Ellie nervously messages Greenwood and lets him know she is in London for a week and wants to meet him in person. Greenwood, on hold to attempt to deal with his bill problem still, doesn't respond, fearing that he would have to show her he has a stutter.

The next day, Greenwood is at his father's home and his father is on the phone arguing with the company about communicating with his son about his bill. Ellie sends another message, sad that Greenwood has not replied. He begins to craft a response with a made up excuse as to why he can't meet her but changes his mind and doesn't reply.

The next morning, Greenwood begins learning sign language, pretending to be deaf to avoid speaking, though in his head he clearly answers people and wishes he could talk to them. He later has a moment of clarity and responds to Ellie, telling her he would love to meet her. That evening while waiting for a bus and nervously waiting for a reply, Greenwood intervenes when a man is attempting to assault a woman. The results of the intervention are seen when Greenwood has a bandage across his nose.

That night, while lonely and practising his sign and waiting for a reply from Ellie, Greenwood makes a snap judgment on himself, Greenwood observes that he's a poor communicator and is full of self-pity. But just as he's about to go to sleep, he hears the alert of a message reply. The reply isn't shown, but Greenwood looks nervous and pleased. The next day he's shown getting ready and then traveling to see her, all the while practising what he will say to Ellie in his head.

Once he arrives, standing across the street, he witnesses as a stranger attempts to speak to Ellie from behind. She does not respond until he taps her shoulder and she turns to sign to him, showing that she is deaf. She finally makes eye contact with Greenwood and they both smile. She finally waves and signs to ask him to cross the street. He smiles and nods as the screen fades to black.

Cast
Matthew Needham as Greenwood Carsen
Chloe Pirrie as Ellie Parks
Eric Richard as Greenwood's Dad
Richard Mason as Angry man at bus stop

Critical reception
Stutterer won Best Live Action Short Film at the 88th Academy Awards in 2016.

Awards and nominations

References

External links

 
 , posted by The New Yorker

Stuttering
2015 films
2015 drama films
2015 short films
Live Action Short Film Academy Award winners
2010s English-language films